"Go Harder" may refer to:

"Go Harder", song by British boyband JLS from 4th Dimensions Tour 	
"Go Harder", song by Jaz-O
"Go Harder", song by Future from Pluto (Future album)